Pirates! may refer to:

 Sid Meier's Pirates!: a 1987 video game, created by Sid Meier
 Pirates! Gold: a 1993 computer game, a remake of Sid Meier's 1987 release, Sid Meier's Pirates!
 Sid Meier's Pirates! (2004 video game): a 2004 remake of the Sid Meier's video game
 The series of The Pirates! books written by Gideon Defoe
 The Pirates! in an Adventure with Scientists
 The Pirates! in an Adventure with Whaling (published in the United States as The Pirates! In an Adventure with Ahab)
 The Pirates! in an Adventure with Communists
 The Pirates! in an Adventure with Napoleon
 The Pirates! Band of Misfits, a 2012 animated film based on the books by Gideon Defoe

See also
 Pirate (disambiguation)